Babbler is a French software company founded in September 2012 by sisters Hannah Oiknine and Sarah Azan. Babbler is headquartered in Paris and opened a second office in New York City in September 2015. Babbler is an opt-in social network that is exclusive to public relations professionals and members of the media. Babbler took part in the interactive track of the 2016 SXSW festival as an exhibitor. Soon after, in April 2016, Babbler closed a series A funding round worth 2 million euros from leading European venture capitalists.

References

Software companies of France
Software companies established in 2012
French companies established in 2012